Khmelnytskyi Oblast, also known as Khmelnychchyna, is an oblast (province) in western Ukraine covering portions of the historical regions of western Podolia and southern Volhynia. The administrative center of the oblast is the city of Khmelnytskyi. 

Created in 1937 out of border okrugs of Vinnytsia Oblast, in 1941–44 it was under Nazi Germany occupation and part of the Reichskommissariat Ukraine (Wolhynien und Podolien general district). Following the Kamenets-Podolsky pocket in spring of 1944 as part of the Proskurov-Chernovtsy operation, Soviet troops removed the German occupation in the region. Until 4 February 1954 it was called Kamianets-Podilsky Oblast and was centered in Kamianets-Podilsky until 1941. The region rebranding took place after the official renaming of the region's administrative center to Khmelnytskyi.

Geography
Khmelnytskyi Oblast has a total area of  (3.4% of the total area of Ukraine) and is located between 48°27' and 50°37' north latitude and between 26°09' and 27°56' east longitude. It is associated with a historical region of Podolia, yet in reality its territory is split almost in half, the northern in Volhynia, and the southern in Podolia. Its Volhynian region contains smaller cities like Izyaslav, Starokostiantyniv, Shepetivka, while its Podolian portion more developed cities of Khmelnytskyi and Kamianets-Podilskyi.

The oblast borders the Rivne Oblast to the northwest, the Zhytomyr Oblast to the northeast, the Vinnytsia Oblast to the east, the Chernivtsi Oblast to the south, and the Ternopil Oblast to the west.

Elevations

The Podolian Upland (270–370 meters above sea-level) occupies the central area of the Khmelnytska oblast. The northwestern areas of the oblast are part of the Volyn highland (highest point — 329 m above sea-level), while to the north, the oblast claims a part of the historic region of Polissia (highest point — 200–250 m above sea-level). The southwestern territory of the Khmelnytska oblast is crossed by the Tovtry range (translit. Tovtryi kryazh), which includes Mount Velyka Buhaikha, the highest point of the oblast at 409 m above sea-level. The extreme south of the oblast has a surface with canyon-like river valleys. The Dneister Reservoir located there is the lowest point of the oblast (121 m above sea-level) .

Rivers and Lakes

The largest of these are the Dniester River (which flows for  within the oblast), as well as its tributaries: Smotrych, Ushytsia, and the Zbruch — and the Southern Buh River (which flows for  within the oblast), as well as its tributaries: Buzhok, Ikva, and Vovk. The rivers of the Dnieper River's basin — Horyn, Khmora, and Sluch Rivers also run through the oblast. The oblast's lakes are located mostly in basin of the Horyn River. The largest reservoir in the oblast is the Dniester Reservoir.

There are 1858 ponds and/or reservoirs in the oblast. The largest of these include Shchedrivske (with a surface area of ), Novostavske (with a surface area of ), and Kuzmynske (with a surface area of ).

History
Historic administrative affiliation of the area:
 1937-1941: USSR, Ukrainian SSR
 1944-1991: USSR, Ukrainian SSR
 since 1991: Ukraine:  Khmelnytskyi region 

Khmelnytskyi Oblast was created on September 22, 1937 as the Kamianets-Podilskyi Oblast (translit., Kamyanets-Podil'ska oblast’) out of border okrugs (Prokuriv and Kamianets-Podilskyi) of the Vinnytsia Oblast. 

In March 1941 the administrative center of the oblast was moved from Kamianets-Podilskyi to the city of Proskuriv. During the World War II the territory was part of another administrative division (General District Wolhynien und Podolien, see Reichskommissariat Ukraine), but after liberation from the Nazi Germany, Khmelnytskyi Oblast was reinstated in its original borders. In 1954, Proskuriv was renamed Khmelnytskyi, and soon afterward, the oblast was renamed to Khmelnytskyi Oblast (translit., Khmel'nytska oblast’).

Administrative divisions

The oblast is subdivided into 3 raions (administrative districts). It consists of 6 municipalities, 13 cities, 24 towns, and more than 1,417 villages.

The following data incorporates the number of each type of administrative divisions of Kyiv Oblast:

 Administrative Center – 1 (Khmelnytskyi)
 Raions — 3;
 City raions — 0;
 Settlements — 1452, including:
 Villages — 1415;
 Cities/Towns — 37, including:
 Urban-type settlement — 24;
 Cities — 13, including:
 Cities of oblast' subordinance — 6;
 Cities of raion subordinance — 7;
 Selsovets — 568.

The local administration of the oblast' is controlled by the Khmelnytska oblast Rada. The governor of the oblast' is the Khmelnytska oblast Rada speaker, appointed by the President of Ukraine.

Demographics

Khmelnytskyi Oblast's population is 1,401,140 as of January 1, 2004. As of 2002, the oblast ranks 13th by population in Ukraine. The population density is 69.5/km².

Pensioners make up 453,800 thousand people or 31,7% of population. The birth rate per 1,000 residents is 8.3, and the death rate — per 1000 residents – 16.1. The urban population, according to the 2001 Ukrainian Census data, accounted for 729,600 people, or 51%, and the rural population — for 701,200 people, or 49%.

According to the data, the number of men accounted for 659,900 people, or 46.1%, that of women — 770,900 people, or 53.9%.

Age structure
 0-14 years: 15.1%  (male 101,597/female 95,783)
 15-64 years: 68.5%  (male 435,464/female 463,058)
 65 years and over: 16.4%  (male 69,479/female 145,420) (2013 official)

Median age
 total: 40.4 years 
 male: 37.1 years 
 female: 43.6 years  (2013 official)

Economy

The economy of the oblast mostly deals with the energy industry, transport and agriculture. The oblast is situated at a historical crossroad of the railway and highway routes connecting Central Europe to Black Sea coast and Russia (with the city of Shepetivka being the most important railway junction). The Khmelnyts’ka nuclear power plant in the city of Netishyn is the most important industrial company of the oblast. Notable machinery, armament and chemical industries are also present.

Attractions
Kamianets National historical-architectural preserve
Medzhybizh National historical-cultural preserve
Samchyky State historical-cultural preserve

Nomenclature

Most of Ukraine's oblasts are named after their administrative center cities, officially referred to as "oblast centers" (translit. oblasnyi tsentr). The name of each oblast is a relative adjective, formed by adding a feminine suffix to the name of respective center city: Khmelnytskyi is the center of the Khmelnyts’ka oblast’ (Khmelnytska oblast).

See also
 List of villages in Khmelnytskyi Oblast
 Subdivisions of Ukraine
 Volhynia
 Podolia

References

Inline

 Information Card of the Region – Official site of the Cabinet of Ministers of Ukraine

External links

 adm-km.gov.ua – Official website of Khmelnytska oblast Administration 
 Khmelnytsky – Site of Khmelnytskyi 

 
Oblasts of Ukraine
States and territories established in 1937
1937 establishments in Ukraine